Qingyuan Subdistrict is a township-level division of Chang'an District, Shijiazhuang, Hebei, China.

Translation 
The English literal translation for 青园 (Qīng Yuán) is Green (青, Qīng) Garden (园, Yuán).

See also
List of township-level divisions of Hebei

References

Township-level divisions of Hebei